Chemanchery  is a village in Kozhikode district in the state of Kerala, India.

Demographics
 India census, Chemancheri had a population of 32532 with 15281 males and 17251 females.

Chemancheri Kunhiraman Nair

Chemancheri Kunhiraman Nair was a renowned Kathakali artist from Chemancheri.He spent the last eighty years in learning Kathakali and  teaching it.  He has done the role of Krishna alone more than a thousand times. The Government of India awarded him the fourth highest civilian honor of the Padma Shri in 2017.

Transportation
Chemancheri village connects to other parts of India through Koyilandy town.  The nearest airports are at Kannur and Kozhikode.  The nearest railway station is at Chemancheri and Koyiandy.  The national highway no.66 passes through Koyilandy and the northern stretch connects to Mangalore, Goa and Mumbai.  The southern stretch connects to Cochin and Trivandrum.  The eastern National Highway No.54 going through Kuttiady connects to Mananthavady, Mysore and Bangalore.

See also
 Moodadi
 Chengottukavu
 Arikkulam
 Thikkodi
 Kappad
 Atholi
 Ulliyeri
 Cheekilode
 Nochad
 Koyilandy
 Chemancheri railway station

References

Koyilandy area